In electrical engineering, low voltage is a relative term, the definition varying by context.  Different definitions are used in electric power transmission and distribution, compared with electronics design. electrical safety codes define "low voltage" circuits that are exempt from the protection required at higher voltages. These definitions vary by country and specific codes or regulations.

IEC Definition

 May depend on the applicable standard used.

The International Electrotechnical Commission (IEC) Standard IEC 61140:2016 defines Low voltage as 0 to 1000 V AC RMS or 0 to 1500 V DC Other standards such as IEC 60038 defines supply system low voltage as voltage in the range 50 to 1000 V AC or 120 to 1500 V DC in IEC Standard Voltages which defines power distribution system voltages around the world.

In electrical power systems low voltage most commonly refers to the mains voltages as used by domestic and light industrial and commercial consumers. "Low voltage" in this context still presents a risk of electric shock, but only a minor risk of electric arcs through the air.

United Kingdom
British Standard BS 7671, Requirements for Electrical Installations. IET Wiring Regulations, defines supply system low voltage as:
exceeding 50 V ac or 120 V ripple-free dc. 
but not exceeding 1000 V ac or 1500 V dc between conductors, or 600 V ac or 900 V dc between conductors and earth.

The ripple-free direct current requirement only applies to 120 V dc, not to any dc voltage above that. For example, a direct current that is exceeding 1500 V dc during voltage fluctuations it is not categorized as low-voltage.

United States
In electrical power , the US National Electrical Code (NEC), NFPA 70, article 725 (2005), defines low distribution system voltage (LDSV) as 0 to 49 V..

The NFPA standard 79  defines distribution protected extra-low voltage (PELV) as nominal voltage of 30 Vrms or 60 V dc ripple-free for dry locations, and 6 Vrms or 15 V dc in all other cases.

Standard NFPA 70E, Article 130, 2021 Edition, omits energized electrical conductors and circuit parts operating at less than 50 V from its safety requirements of work involving electrical hazards when an electrically safe work condition cannot be established.

UL standard 508A, article 43 (table 43.1) defines 0 to 20 V peak / 5 A or 20.1 to 42.4 V peak / 100 VA as low-voltage limited energy (LVLE) circuits.

See also
 High voltage
 Low Voltage Directive

References

Further reading
Defining Low Voltage Circuits

Electricity
Electrical engineering
Electrical safety